State Road 586 (SR 586) is a state highway in the U.S. state of Florida. A five-mile-long east–west street serving northern Pinellas County, it currently extends from an intersection with Bayshore Boulevard (U.S. Route 19 Alternate (US 19 Alt.) and SR 595) in Dunedin eastward to an intersection with Tampa Road (SR 584 to the southeast, CR 752 - a former alignment of SR 584 - to the northwest) in Oldsmar.  It is locally known as Curlew Road throughout its entire length.

A continuation to the west is Causeway Boulevard, a part of SR 586 that crosses Pope Channel (and the Intracoastal Waterway) and ends at the entrance to Honeymoon Island State Park.  A continuation to the east (after a slight turn to the east-southeast) puts motorists on Tampa Road, which is SR 584 at the turn and becomes SR 580 two miles (3 km) afterward.

Route description
SR 586 begins at an intersection with US 19 Alt./SR 595 in Dunedin, Pinellas County, heading east on Curlew Road, a divided highway with two westbound lanes and one eastbound lane. Past the western terminus, the road continues as Causeway Boulevard, which heads to Honeymoon Island State Park. From the western terminus, the road heads into residential areas with some woods as a three-lane road with a center left-turn lane. SR 586 becomes a four-lane divided highway and crosses CR 1 and becomes the border between Palm Harbor to the north and Dunedin to the south. The highway continues along the southern border of Palm Harbor and intersects CR 501. Following this, the road heads into an area of businesses and widens to six lanes as it comes to a junction with US 19/SR 55. Past here, SR 586 continues back into residential neighborhoods and becomes the border between Palm Harbor to the north and Clearwater to the south. The road intersects the southern terminus of CR 90 and passes through less dense areas of development prior to an intersection with CR 611. After this junction, the highway comes to a bridge over Lake Tarpon Canal, at which point it enters Oldsmar. SR 586 passes a shopping center to the north and homes to the south before it comes to its eastern terminus at an intersection with Tampa Road, which heads northwest as CR 752 and southwest as SR 584.

Major intersections

References

External links

586
586